Galesh Khaleh (also Romanized as Gālesh Khāleh) is a village in Gel-e Sefid Rural District, in the Central District of Langarud County, Gilan Province, Iran. At the 2006 census, its population was 80, in 29 families.

References 

Populated places in Langarud County